The Denmark men's national squash team represents Denmark in international squash team competitions, and is governed by Danish Squash Federation.

Since 1987, Denmark has participated in two round of 16 of the World Squash Team Open.

Current team
 Kristian Frost Olesen
 Rasmus Nielsen
 Morten Sorensen
 Michael Frilund

Results

World Team Squash Championships

European Squash Team Championships

See also 
 Danish Squash Federation
 World Team Squash Championships
 Denmark women's national squash team

References 

Squash teams
Men's national squash teams
Squash
Men's sport in Denmark